Sims Avenue is a one-way major road in Singapore connecting Kallang Road to Jalan Eunos. It extends eastward as Sims Avenue East, and until Siglap Road.

Etymology 
The road was named after Sim Kia Jan, a Chinese businessman.

References

Roads in Singapore
Kallang
Geylang